The 2015 LEN Super Cup was a water polo match organized by LEN and contested by the reigning champions of the two main European club competitions, the 2014-15 LEN Champions League and the 2014-15 LEN Euro Cup.

Squads
The members of the two squads were as follows.

CN Posillipo

Pro Recco

See also
 2015 Women's LEN Super Cup

References

LEN Super Cup
2015 in water polo